Seymur Asadov (born on 5 May 1994) is an Azerbaijani football midfielder who plays for Keşla in the Azerbaijan Premier League.

Club career
On 11 May 2012, Asadov made his debut in the Azerbaijan Premier League for Gabala match against Neftçi Baku.

References

External links
 

1994 births
Living people
Association football midfielders
Azerbaijani footballers
Azerbaijan Premier League players
Gabala FC players
Sumgayit FK players
Sabail FK players
Shamakhi FK players